Scott Bianco (born 9 November 1967 in Kamloops, British Columbia) is a Canadian former wrestler who competed in the 1996 Summer Olympics. He was a six time Canadian Senior Freestyle Champion winning 90 kg four times, 100 kg and 130 kg. A 1994 Commonwealth Gold Medal and 7th place in the world Championships were amongst his other achievements. During his wrestling career he first completed in the NAIA's for Simon Fraser University and then later as a member of the Burnaby Mountain Wrestling Club.

References

External links
 

1967 births
Living people
Sportspeople from Kamloops
Olympic wrestlers of Canada
Wrestlers at the 1996 Summer Olympics
Canadian male sport wrestlers
Commonwealth Games medallists in wrestling
Commonwealth Games gold medallists for Canada
Wrestlers at the 1994 Commonwealth Games
Medallists at the 1994 Commonwealth Games